The Kiro Congo (KCD) is a Catholic youth organization in the Democratic Republic of Congo. It is one of the more important youth movements in the country. Kiro Congo is a member of the Catholic umbrella of youth organizations Fimcap.

History
Kiro was founded on 11 November 1947. The youth movement grew quickly in the 1950s. In 1957 already about 150 Kiro groups existed in the Democratic Republic of Congo. In 1960 Kiro had already about 240 boys' and girls' groups with approximately 17,000 individual members.

Organization
Kiro Congo is structured in the following sections (based on age-groups):

Activities
 Meetings in local groups
 Games, songs, sports, dancing
 Pastoral and spiritual activities on Saturday and Sunday
 Educational activities
 International partnerships

Intercontinental cooperation 
 The work of Kiro Congo is supported by the Flemish NGO Broederlijk Delen.
 Kiro Congo is a member of the Catholic umbrella of youth organizations Fimcap.

References

Catholic youth organizations
Youth organisations based in the Democratic Republic of the Congo
Fimcap
Catholic Church in the Democratic Republic of the Congo